Larqanku (Aymara  irrigation channel, anku tendon; nerve, Hispanicized spelling Larjanco) is a  mountain in the Andes of southern Peru. It is located in the Puno Region, El Collao Province, Santa Rosa District, and in the Tacna Region, Candarave Province, Candarave District. It is southwest of Lurisquta and southeast of Wisk'acha Lake. Larqanku lies between Jisk'a Larqanku ("little Larqanku") in the south and Panti Usu in the northwest.

References

Mountains of Peru
Mountains of Tacna Region
Mountains of Puno Region